Hakan Şükür (born 1 September 1971) is a Turkish former professional footballer who played as a striker. Nicknamed the "Bull of the Bosphorus" and Kral (king), he spent the majority of his professional career with Galatasaray, being a three-time Gol Kralı (Goal King, title and award given to the annual top goalscorer of the Süper Lig), representing the club in three different spells and winning a total of 14 major titles.

Şükür represented Turkey a total of 112 times, scoring 51 goals, making him the nation's top goalscorer and 19th in the world at the time of his retirement. One of the most prolific strikers of the modern era, he netted 383 goals throughout his club career as well as the fastest ever in a World Cup, in 2002. He retired from football in 2008.

In the 2011 general elections, he was elected as an Istanbul MP for the Justice and Development Party. He resigned from the party in December 2013, to serve as an independent. He is wanted for arrest in Turkey since August 2016 for being a member of Gülen movement and has lived in exile in the United States since mid 2016.

Club career

Early years
Born in Sapanca, Sakarya Province, Şükür began his football career with local club Sakaryaspor, making his professional debut shortly after his 17th birthday. His first goal came in a match against Eskişehirspor on 26 February 1989: with the match tied 2–2, he entered the pitch as a substitute and scored the winning goal; he went on to score a further 18 Süper Lig goals in his three-year spell with the club.

In the summer of 1990, Şükür joined fellow first division side Bursaspor. He scored six goals in 27 games in his second season, helping the team to a sixth-place finish, and making his Turkish national team debut shortly after.

Galatasaray – Torino
Subsequently, Şükür signed for national giants Galatasaray SK. Nicknamed the Bull of the Bosphorus, he scored 19 goals in 30 matches in his first year with the club, helping it win both the league and cup titles, adding 16 and 19, respectively, in the next two seasons and attracting the attention of Torino FC. In 1995 he moved to the Italian club, becoming the second Turkish player to ever play in Serie A, but returned to his country and Galatasaray in the following winter transfer window, failing to settle and only netting once in the league.

Upon his return to Galatasaray, Şükür regained his scoring form, scoring 16 goals in the league and helping the club win the cup. The following season, he collected 38 goals in the league, tying him for second-most goals scored in a season with Metin Oktay, one goal behind record holder Tanju Çolak; both players were playing for Galatasaray when they broke the record. Şükür also finished third in the ESM Golden Boot rankings with 57 points, behind Mário Jardel (60) and Ronaldo (68). He won the Gol Kralı award the following two seasons, netting 33 and 18 goals respectively, with the Istanbul side winning the title in all three seasons.

In the 1999–2000 season, Şükür's last with Galatasaray in his second stint, the team completed a domestic double for the second year in succession, and added the year's UEFA Cup, becoming the first Turkish side to win a European title; in the 4–1 penalty shootout win against Arsenal he scored on his attempt, having netted ten times in 17 games during the campaign.

Return to Italy – Blackburn

Şükür then moved to Italy again, this time to Inter Milan, scoring six goals in 35 official matches. His appearances were limited by the presence of Ronaldo and Christian Vieri in the team's attack and January 2002, after one and a half seasons, he signed with another team in the country, Parma FC, but was unable to produce again, only finding the net three times. He helped Parma win the Coppa Italia but only played in the first leg of the final.

Having been released, on 9 December 2002 Şükür joined Blackburn Rovers in the Premier League for the remainder of the campaign, signed by former Galatasaray manager Graeme Souness. His spell began with him sustaining a broken leg in training which ruled him out for two months, after which made his debut for the club on 1 March 2003, replacing the injured Egil Østenstad at half time in a 1–0 home win over Manchester City; he scored twice from nine appearances, both goals coming in a 4–0 defeat of Fulham at Loftus Road on 7 April.

Third spell at Galatasaray
Şükür returned to Galatasaray on 7 July 2003, after failing to negotiate a new contract with Blackburn. He scored 12 times in 28 league games in his first season and 18 in the following, with the team winning the 2005 Turkish cup during that timeframe. Also, on 3 December 2003, he found the net twice in a 2–0 home defeat of Juventus F.C. for the 2003–04 UEFA Champions League; in November 2003, to celebrate UEFA's Jubilee, he was selected as Turkey's Golden Player by the Turkish Football Federation, as their most outstanding player of the past 50 years.

In the 2005–06 season, Şükür again scored in double digits (ten) as Galatasaray again won the league. After helping the club win a record-tying 17th first division title in 2007–08, netting 11 goals, he decided to retire from the game aged nearly 37. Subsequently, he often appeared as a television pundit on Turkish Radio and Television Corporation; during his career, he scored 38 goals in all European competitions.

International career
Şükür won his first cap for Turkey in a friendly with Luxembourg in March 1992 – his debut being awarded by German manager Sepp Piontek – scoring his first international goal in his next match, against Denmark, and totalling six in his first 11 appearances. He netted seven in qualification for UEFA Euro 1996 and started all of the matches at the finals in England, in which they were eliminated in the group stage without scoring a single goal.

Şükür scored eight times in qualification for the 1998 FIFA World Cup: half of those in a 6–4 home win over Wales on 20 August 1997, but Turkey did not reach the play-offs. At Euro 2000 he netted twice for the quarterfinalists, in a 2–0 group stage win against co-hosts Belgium.

During the 2002 World Cup, held in South Korea and Japan, Şükür scored once for Turkey in seven matches as the national team finished in third place. On 29 June he scored the fastest ever goal in a FIFA World Cup, netting against South Korea 10.8 seconds into the third-place play-off (3–2 win).

Of his 112 senior appearances, Şükür captained Turkey in 30. After appearing in some Euro 2008 qualifiers, notably scoring four against Moldova in a 5–0 win in Frankfurt, Germany, he was not selected for the finals, his last game being a 0–1 home loss to Greece at the age of 36 (17 October 2007).

Personal life
Şükür is of Albanian origin. Both of his parents are immigrants from Yugoslavia, his father being born in Pristina, and his mother in Skopje. His surname is spelled "Shykyr" in Albanian. His first wife, Esra Elbirlik, married him in a ceremony broadcast live on television, initiated by Prime Minister Tansu Çiller and performed by Mayor of Istanbul Recep Tayyip Erdoğan.

The couple divorced after four months, and Elbirlik and her family died in the 1999 İzmit earthquake. Şükür fathered three children with his second spouse, Beyda. In 2010, the football stadium of Sancaktepe was named after him. In April 2014, his name was removed again.

Politics
On 18 June 2011, Şükür was elected as a Member of Parliament to the Grand National Assembly of Turkey in the 2011 general elections, from the ruling Justice and Development Party (AKP), representing the 2nd electoral district of Istanbul Province.

On 16 December 2013, Şükür, known for his links to the Islamic Gülen movement of the Turkish cleric Fethullah Gülen, resigned from his position in protest after the interdiction of the group's "dershane" system, and decided to continue working as an independent MP. He subsequently went on to work as a football pundit for Turkish Radio and Television Corporation.

Prosecution and exile 
In February 2016, Şükür was charged with insulting president Recep Tayyip Erdoğan on Twitter. In August, a warrant was issued for his arrest as he was charged with being a member of the Gülen movement, designated as a terrorist organization in Turkey.

Şükür fled Turkey in November 2017, taking up self-exile in San Francisco, California and planning to become a restaurateur in Palo Alto. He left this job because "strange people kept coming into the bar".

In January 2020, Şükür told Germany's Welt am Sonntag that he was working as an Uber driver and selling books in the United States. He also said that his houses, businesses and bank accounts in Turkey had been seized by the government.

The Turkish government seems to be still very sensitive to the subject.  In December of 2022 during the TRT broadcast of a World Cup match, a commentator (Alper Bakircigil) mentioned a record held by Şükür. He was removed from the broadcast at half-time and fired from his job later that day. News accounts speculated that his firing was due to his employer (state-run TRT) reacting to the mention of the name.

Career statistics

Club

International

Scores and results list Turkey's goal tally first, score column indicates score after each Şükür goal.

Honours
Sakaryaspor
 Turkish Cup: 1987–88

Galatasaray
 Süper Lig: 1992–93, 1993–94, 1996–97, 1997–98, 1998–99, 1999–2000, 2005–06, 2007–08
 Turkish Cup: 1992–93, 1995–96, 1998–99, 1999–2000, 2004–05
 President Cup: 1993, 1997
 UEFA Cup: 1999–2000

Parma
 Coppa Italia: 2001–02

Inter
 Supercoppa Italiana runner-up: 2000

Turkey
 Mediterranean Games: 1993
 FIFA World Cup: third place 2002

Individual
 Süper Lig: Top Scorer 1996–97, 1997–98, 1998–99
 IFFHS World's Best Top Division Goal Scorer: 1997
 UEFA Jubilee Awards: Turkey's Golden Player 2004
 Top Scorer of Turkish League of all Times: 249 goals
 Top Scoring Turkish Player in Champions League: 22 goals
 Golden Foot Legends Award: 2014

Further reading

See also
 List of top international men's football goalscorers by country
 List of men's footballers with 100 or more international caps
 List of men's footballers with 50 or more international goals

References

Bibliography

External links

 
 
 
 
 

1971 births
Living people
Sportspeople from Adapazarı
Turkish people of Albanian descent
Turkish footballers
Association football forwards
Süper Lig players
Sakaryaspor footballers
Bursaspor footballers
Galatasaray S.K. footballers
Serie A players
Torino F.C. players
Inter Milan players
Parma Calcio 1913 players
Premier League players
Blackburn Rovers F.C. players
Turkey youth international footballers
Turkey under-21 international footballers
Turkey international footballers
UEFA Euro 1996 players
UEFA Euro 2000 players
2002 FIFA World Cup players
Competitors at the 1991 Mediterranean Games
Competitors at the 1993 Mediterranean Games
Mediterranean Games medalists in football
Mediterranean Games gold medalists for Turkey
Mediterranean Games silver medalists for Turkey
Turkish expatriate footballers
Expatriate footballers in Italy
Expatriate footballers in England
Turkish expatriate sportspeople in Italy
Turkish expatriate sportspeople in England
UEFA Golden Players
FIFA Century Club
UEFA Cup winning players
Turkish sportsperson-politicians
Deputies of Istanbul
Justice and Development Party (Turkey) politicians
Members of the 24th Parliament of Turkey
Gülen movement
Stateless people
Turkish emigrants to the United States
Turkish exiles
Turkish people of Macedonian descent
Turkish people of Kosovan descent
Independent politicians